Ti Rocher is the name of the geographic items:
 Ti Rocher, Micoud, settlement of Micoud, St Lucia
 Ti Rocher, Castries, settlement of Castries, St Lucia
 Morne Ti Rocher, Mountain of Haiti